Osama Abdelaziz Mokhtar Ali Maher (born 15 December 1968) is a Swedish conservative politician and Member of Parliament.

Osama Ali Maher was born in Cairo in Egypt. He came to Sweden in 1996. He has worked for the United Nations in Darfur and in Pakistan. He lives in Limhamn in Malmö.

External links
Osama Ali Maher (M)

Living people
1968 births
Members of the Riksdag from the Moderate Party
Politicians from Malmö
Egyptian emigrants to Sweden